Vipera lotievi, commonly known as the Caucasian meadow viper, is a species of venomous snake in the family Viperidae. The species is endemic to Azerbaijan, Georgia, and Russia. There are no subspecies that are recognized as being valid.

Etymology
The specific name, lotievi, is in honor of Russian herpetologist K. Yu Lotiev, who collected the holotype and some of the paratypes.

Description

Reproduction
Vipera lotievi is viviparous.

Range
Vipera lotievi is found in the higher range of the Big Caucasus mountain range in Russia, Georgia, and Azerbaijan.

The type locality is listed as "Armkhi, Checheno-Ingushetia, Russia, below Mt. Stolovaya, 2000 m altitude" [Armkhi, Respublika Ingushetiya, Russia, 6,600 ft].

References

Further reading

Nilson G, Höggren M, Tuniyev BS, Orlov NL, Andrén C (1994). "Phylogeny of the Vipers of the Caucasus (Reptilia, Viperidae)". Zoologica Scripta 23 (4): 353-360.
Nilson G, Tuniyev BS, Orlov N, Höggren M, Andrén C (1995). "Systematics of the Vipers of the Caucasus: Polymorphism or Sibling Species?" Asiatic Herpetological Research 6: 1-26. (Vipera lotievi, new species, pp. 21–24, Figure 22).

External links

lotievi
Snakes of Asia
Reptiles of Azerbaijan
Reptiles described in 1995
Reptiles of Russia